Jan Antonie van Diepenbeek (5 August 1903 – 8 August 1981) was a Dutch international footballer who played for Ajax, HEDW and Wilhelmina Vooruit. He represented the Netherlands national football team at the 1934 FIFA World Cup, but did not play a game.

Club career
The bespectacled Van Diepenbeek played 207 matches for Ajax between 1929 and 1938, before joining Wilhelmina Vooruit and its successor WV-HEDW.

International career
Van Diepenbeek made his debut for the Netherlands in a December 1933 friendly match against Austria and earned a total of 4 caps, scoring no goals. His final international was a February 1935 friendly against Netherlands.

References

External links
 
 Player profile at VoetbalStats.nl
 AFC Ajax official profile

1903 births
1981 deaths
Footballers from Utrecht (city)
Association football fullbacks
Dutch footballers
Netherlands international footballers
1934 FIFA World Cup players
AFC Ajax players